Quick Pick is a 2006 American comedy film directed by Will Vazquez. The movie stars John Bryant as Eddie; Anna Moreno-Nava as Monica; Angelina Assereto as Sonia; Oscar A. Diaz as Chris; Andy Sottilare as Dr. Otto Von Delft; Rafael Diaz-Wagner as Rudy. Quick Pick made its world premiere in 2006 at the Chicago Latino Film Festival and opened the Kansas International Film Festival. The film is scheduled for video release in August 2007.

External links
Maverick Entertainment
 

2006 films
2006 comedy films
2000s Spanish-language films
American comedy films
2006 directorial debut films
2000s English-language films
2000s American films